Rajindra Mangallie (born 13 August 1965) is a Trinidadian cricketer. He played in one first-class and six List A matches for Trinidad and Tobago from 1992 to 1995.

See also
 List of Trinidadian representative cricketers

References

External links
 

1965 births
Living people
Trinidad and Tobago cricketers